Brian Taylor (2 July 1949 – 1993) was an English footballer who played in the Football League for Plymouth Argyle, Preston North End, Walsall and Wigan Athletic.

External links
 

English footballers
English Football League players
1960 births
1993 deaths
Coventry City F.C. players
Walsall F.C. players
Plymouth Argyle F.C. players
Preston North End F.C. players
Wigan Athletic F.C. players
Date of death missing
Association football wingers